The James Parsons Building is the single largest building belonging to Liverpool John Moores University in Liverpool, England. It is located at LJMU's Byrom Street City Campus and built in 1960 as part of Liverpool Polytechnic. Later additions were made in 1966 and 1970, although extensive modernisation is taking place internally and externally as of 2010. The Faculty of Science and part of the Faculty of Technology and the Environment are based in the James Parsons Building - which has laboratories, ICT suites and lecture theatres throughout as well as two cafés and university shop.

The entire third floor of the James Parsons Building was the first internal aspect to be renovated, whilst cladding worth £3.4 million was applied to the external facade during 2009 and 2010.

References

James Parsons Building
James Parsons Building